List of awards and nominations received by Michelle Williams may refer to:

 List of awards and nominations received by Michelle Williams (actress)
 List of awards and nominations received by Michelle Williams (singer)